Amit Gilitwala (born 11 October 1995) is an Indian professional darts player who currently plays in Professional Darts Corporation (PDC) events. He is an Indian Champion and first player from India who played at the PDC World Youth Championship. He represented his country during the PDC World Cup of Darts, WDF World Cup and WDF Asia-Pacific Cup. His biggest achievement to date was a start in the 2021 PDC World Darts Championship.

Career
In 2011, Gilitwala won the Indian Championship few months after he start playing darts, by beat a Ankit Goenka in the final by 4–3 in legs. In the same year, he took part in the 2011 WDF World Cup taking part in youth competitions. In the singles competition, he was eliminated in the group-stage, after two losses against Jake Jones and Max Hopp. In the mixed pairs competition he played for India with Amita-Rani Ahir, but they lost in the group-stage.

A year later, he was selected by the national federation to represent India during the WDF Asia-Pacific Cup. In the pairs and team competition he was eliminated taking the last place in the group. In the singles competition, he was eliminated in the group-stage. In 2014, Gilitwala took part in the PDC Development Tour competition and was qualified for the 2014 PDC World Youth Championship. In the first round match, he lost to Jake Patchett by 0–6 in legs.

In June 2014, he represented his home country at the 2014 PDC World Cup of Darts together with Nitin Kumar. In the first round match they competed against Belgium (Kim Huybrechts and Ronny Huybrechts), but lost by 0–5 in legs. After a longer break with international starts, Gilitwala took part in the PDC Q-School in 2018, but was not successful there. In 2021, he was nominated by Indian Darts Federation for the 2021 PDC World Darts Championship. In the first round match, he lost to Steve West by 0–3 in sets. He played an average over 80 points, but had problem on the doubles.

World Championship results

PDC
 2021: First round (lost to Steve West 0–3) (sets)

Performance timeline

References

1995 births
Living people
Indian darts players
Professional Darts Corporation associate players
PDC World Cup of Darts Indian team